humalien is a 4-track EP by Earthlings? released in 2009 through Treasure Craft Records. It was released as a 10" Vinyl EP and as a digital download (in MP3 and "FULL RES" formats).

Track listing
"Tea Glitter" – 4:35
"666er" – 4:07
"Disposable Brain" – 4:06
"Unicorn" - 4:28

Credits
earthlings?
Dave Catching - Guitars
Pete Stahl - Vocals
Adam Maples - drums, vocals
Edmund Monsef - producer/engineer
Mathias Schneeberger - Keyboards, Guitars
Brian O'Connor - bass
Clint Walsh - guitar
Brant Bjork - drums
Molly McGuire - Bass

Earthlings? albums
2009 EPs